The Rose Ladies Series is a ladies professional golf tour founded in 2020 and organised by Justin Rose and his wife, Kate Rose. The tour was announced following the reintroduction of golf in the United Kingdom after the COVID-19 pandemic lockdowns and while the Ladies European Tour was suspended as a result of the impact of the COVID-19 pandemic on professional golf. The introduction of the series was also heavily influenced by Ladies European Tour member Liz Young.

In its inaugural season, each of the first seven single-round stroke play tournaments and the three-round grand final were played behind closed doors. The tournaments were funded by Justin and Kate Rose with sponsorship being provided by American Golf and Computacenter and the players paying an entry fee to compete in each tournament. The Order of Merit was won by Charley Hull, who overtook Georgia Hall with a runner-up finish in the final event, which was reverted to the scores after 36 holes when play in the final round at Wentworth was abandoned due to a fire on Chobham Common spreading onto the course.

The series returned with an expanded schedule of eleven tournaments in 2021, and again in 2022, with a reduced number of tournaments held earlier in the season as the main tours had returned to normal.

Television coverage
Media coverage of the tournaments was provided by Sky Sports.

Results

2020 season

2021 season

2022 season

Standings

2020 season
The table below show the final points standings.

See also
2020 Ladies European Tour

References

External links

2020 in golf
2021 in golf
2022 in golf
Professional golf tours
2020 establishments in England